Patrick Gallagher (born February 21, 1968) is a Canadian actor. He is most famous for his Attila the Hun role in Night at the Museum. He received a BAFTA Award for Performer in a Supporting Role nomination for his work in Ghost of Tsushima.

Personal life
Gallagher was born in New Westminster, British Columbia, Canada, and grew up in Chilliwack, British Columbia. Born to an Irish American father and a Chinese Canadian mother, Gallagher holds dual American and Canadian citizenship.

Career
Gallagher is known for his television roles as Joe Finn in Da Vinci's Inquest, the alcohol salesman in Entourage, Leon in The Line, Farhod the Fierce in Pair of Kings, and Ken Tanaka in Glee, and his film roles as Awkward Davies in Master and Commander: The Far Side of the World and Gary the bartender in Sideways. He played Attila the Hun in Night at the Museum and its sequels, Chow in True Blood, Colquitt in Final Destination 3, Anderson in Severed: Forest of the Dead, and the head of security, Hugo, in the short-lived series Endgame. Gallagher made guest appearances in Battlestar Galactica, Smallville, Hawaii Five-0, Intelligence, NCIS: Los Angeles, Fuller House and Psych in addition to Hell's Kitchen as a guest for the 100th dinner service. He landed the recurring role of a prison guard on the ABC soap opera General Hospital. He voiced Khotun Khan in Ghost of Tsushima.

Filmography

Film

Television

Video games

References

External links

1968 births
Living people
American male actors of Chinese descent
American male film actors
American male television actors
American people of Chinese descent
American people of Irish descent
Canadian male actors of Chinese descent
Canadian male film actors
Canadian male television actors
Canadian male video game actors
Canadian male voice actors
Canadian people of Irish descent
Male actors from British Columbia
People from New Westminster